Sunshine is an Australian crime drama series which debuted on SBS on 18 October 2017. The four-part miniseries is an Essential Media production, directed by Daina Reid and written by Matt Cameron and Elise McCredie.

Plot
Sunshine is based in Melbourne's inner–western suburb of Sunshine and its surrounds. The story follows Jacob Garang, a young, aspiring South Sudanese-Australian basketballer who is on the cusp of being picked up by scouts for the US College league. He becomes a chief suspect in a police investigation involving a 15-year-old girl, found seriously injured in one of Melbourne's more affluent suburbs.

A second strand in the story concerns Eddie (LaPaglia), owner of the sports shop, who is persuaded to take over coaching duties of the Sunshine Kings basketball team from the earnest but ineffectual parson Skelton (Gyngell). Under new management the team becomes successful and Eddie becomes accepted by the Sudanese community who are the backbone of team. A serious incident in his racist past comes to light and they feel betrayed, resulting in an irreparable loss of trust.

A third strand is the efforts of lawyer Zara Skelton (Lynskey), daughter of the parson, to divert the police from treating the Sudanese as suspects, and eventually helps them discover the truth.

Cast

 Anthony LaPaglia as Eddie
 Melanie Lynskey as Zara Skelton
 Wally Elnour as Jacob Garang
 Ror da Poet as Deng Deng
 Autiak Aweteek as Santino Dut
 Nick Perry as Dazzler
 Ana Boal as Mari Garang
 Jufia Ajobong as Grace Garang
 Tiarnie Coupland as Elly Messina
 Kim Gyngell as Rev. Neil 'The Peacock' Skelton
 Jane Bayly as Pat Skelton
 Nyandeng Makuer as Alek Deng
 Kor Puoc as Manute Deng
 Paul Ireland as DSS Ian Sloane
 Leah Vandenberg as DSC Jaya Prasad
 Piath Mcathiang as Nyagua Nyawan
 Vince Colosimo as Tony Messina
 Freya Stafford as Freya Messina
 Rupert Reid as Ben Canny
 Kyle Eliott as Vlad Cilic
 Emmanuel Martin Malou as Lam Bol
 Zhong Duo (Andy) Xia as Mike Wong
 Arec Athum as Ayei
 Anyuop Dau as Darna
 Ben Klarenaar as Larry Grattan
 Trudy Hellier as Jackie Grattan
 Joe Hooks as Carlyle Jones
 Bev Killick as Bev (Stadium Official)
 Gloria Ajenstat as Doctor
 Peter Hitchener as Newsreader
 Maggie Naouri as Rima Saad
 Alex Cooke as Young Constable
 Bernard Curry as Dean Simic
 Dinesh Matthew as Karim
 Tethloach Ruey as Ruai Nyawan
 Troy Davis as Labourer
 Bryce Hardy as Redbacks Coach
 Rory Bochner as Mia Canny

Episodes

Reception
Guardian Australia critic Luke Buckmaster described the series as an "excellent, beautifully balanced drama", and "one of the standout TV shows of the year". On 6 December 2017, the series received the AACTA Award for Best Telefeature, Mini Series or Short Run Series at the 7th AACTA Awards ceremony. It also received three nominations at the 2018 Monte-Carlo Television Festival: Best Long Fiction Program, Outstanding Actor in a Long Fiction Program (Anthony LaPaglia), and Outstanding Actress in a Long Fiction Program (Melanie Lynskey).

Home media
The mini-series has been published by Roadshow Entertainment as four separate episodes as broadcast, in a two-DVD package.

References

Special Broadcasting Service original programming
2017 Australian television series debuts
2017 Australian television series endings
2010s Australian crime television series
2010s Australian drama television series
2010s crime drama television series
English-language television shows
Murder in television
Basketball television series
Sunshine, Victoria